= Nishika de Silva =

Sri Lankan cricketer (born 1990)

Personal information
- Born: 18 July 1990 (age 35)
- Source: Cricinfo, 14 June 2021

Nishika de Silva (born 18 July 1990) is a Sri Lankan cricketer who played for the Sri Lanka women's cricket team. She made her Women's Twenty20 International cricket (WT20I) debut against India Women on 22 February 2016, and played in a total of three matches for the Sri Lankan team.
